The 2003 Houston Astros season was the 42nd season for the Major League Baseball (MLB) franchise in Houston, Texas.

Regular season
During a 3–2 loss to the Montreal Expos on April 26, first baseman Jeff Bagwell's infield single gave him 2,000 hits for his career, joining Craig Biggio as the only Astros players to achieve this mark.   

On June 11, six Astros pitchers combined to throw a no-hitter against the New York Yankees, establishing a major league record for most pitchers contributing to a no-hitter.  The six were Roy Oswalt, Pete Munro, Kirk Saarloos, Brad Lidge, Octavio Dotel and Billy Wagner.  It was the first no-hitter against the Yankees in 45 years.

Playing the Cincinnati Reds on July 20, Bagwell hit two home runs for the 400th of his career off Danny Graves, becoming the 35th player in MLB history to do so. 

ESPN's "The List" ranked Bagwell and Biggio as the second- and third-most underrated athletes of the top four North American professional sports leagues in an August publication.

Standings

National League Central

Record vs. opponents

Notable transactions
May 1, 2003: Julio Lugo was designated for assignment, and then released 10 days later after "hitting his wife in the face and slamming her head on a car hood" outside of Minute Maid Park.
June 3, 2003: Josh Anderson was drafted by the Houston Astros in the 4th round of the 2003 amateur draft. Player signed June 13, 2003.
August 21, 2003: Gregg Zaun was released by the Houston Astros.

Roster

Players stats

Batting

Starters by position 
Note: Pos = Position; G = Games played; AB = At bats; H = Hits; Avg. = Batting average; HR = Home runs; RBI = Runs batted in

Other batters 
Note: G = Games played; AB = At bats; H = Hits; Avg. = Batting average; HR = Home runs; RBI = Runs batted in

Pitching

Starters 
Note: G = Games pitched; IP = Innings pitched; W = Wins; L = Losses; ERA = Earned run average; SO = Strikeouts

Other pitchers 
Note: G = Games pitched; IP = Innings pitched; W = Wins; L = Losses; ERA = Earned run average; SO = Strikeouts

Relief pitchers 
Note: G = Games pitched; W = Wins; L = Losses; SV = Saves; ERA = Earned run average; SO = Strikeouts

Farm system

References

External links
2003 Houston Astros season at Baseball Reference
Game Logs:
1st Half: Houston Astros Game Log on ESPN.com
2nd Half: Houston Astros Game Log on ESPN.com
Batting Statistics: Houston Astros Batting Stats on ESPN.com
Pitching Statistics: Houston Astros Pitching Stats on ESPN.com

Houston Astros seasons
Houston Astros Season, 2003
2003 in sports in Texas